The AIR Awards of 2017 is the eleventh annual Australian Independent Record Labels Association Music Awards (generally known as the AIR Awards) and was an award ceremony at Queen's Theatre Adelaide, Australia on 27 July 2017. This is the first time the event was held in South Australia.

There were no awards in 2016, due to the move in the eligibility dates for the AIR Awards to align with the calendar year. The 2017 awards saw a slightly longer eligibility period than usual with members' releases period between 1 August 2015 and 31 December 2016.

AIR General manager, Maria Amato commented "It was great to see the Industry turn out in droves to celebrate the success of the Independent sector at the 11th AIR Awards in Adelaide. So proud of the collaborations with the South Australian Government and our supporting partners that helped us make this all happen."

Performers
A.B. Original 
Ngaiire
Henry Wagons
Russell Morris
Elizabeth Rose

Nominees and winners

AIR Awards
Winners are listed first and highlighted in boldface; other final nominees are listed alphabetically.

See also
Music of Australia

References

2017 in Australian music
2017 music awards
AIR Awards